The 2010–11 Barbados Premier Division (officially the Digicel Premiere League for sponsorship reasons) was the 65th season of the highest tier of football in Barbados. The season began on 13 February and concluded on 3 July. The league champions were Youth Milan, who won their second title, and their first since 2006.

Changes from 2010
 Silver Sands and BDF were relegated to the Barbados First Division.
 Bagatelle and St. John's Sonnets were promoted to the Premier Division.

Table

Results

Positions by round

Statistics

Top Scorers

Related Competitions

CFU Club Championship 

As champions of the 2010 Barbados Premier Division, Notre Dame SC were allowed entry into the 2011 CFU Club Championship, to compete in the First elimination stage of the preliminary round. However, due to travel costs, Notre Dame declined to participate in the tournament. The last time a Barbadian club entered the tournament was in the 2000 CFU Club Championship in which Notre Dame finished second in their group during the first round, failing to qualify for the championship round.

References

2011
Barb
Barb
football